Limitless Airways was a charter airline based in Rijeka, Croatia. It was launched by Scandjet, a Swedish tour operator, and offered flights from Scandinavia to the northern Adriatic coast of Croatia and to Bosnia and Herzegovina.

History
Limitless Airways was founded in January 2015 and commenced operations in May the same year. The company was legally registered in Croatia.

In 2016, the airline ceased all operations.

Destinations

Fleet
The Limitless Airways fleet consisted of the following aircraft (as of August 2016):

References

Defunct airlines of Croatia
Airlines established in 2015
Airlines disestablished in 2016
Defunct charter airlines